The 2020 OFC Champions League qualifying stage was played from 25 to 31 January 2020. A total of four teams competed in the qualifying stage to decide two of the 16 places in the group stage of the 2020 OFC Champions League.

Draw
The draw and the hosts of the qualifying stage were announced by the OFC on 13 December 2019. The champions of the four developing associations were drawn to positions 1 to 4 determine the fixtures.

Format
The four teams in the qualifying stage played each other on a round-robin basis at a centralised venue. The winners and runners-up advanced to the group stage to join the 14 direct entrants. According to the group stage draw:
The qualifying stage winners advanced to Group D.
The qualifying stage runners-up advanced to Group C.

Schedule
Matches were played between 25–31 January 2020 in New Zealand. The schedule of each matchday was as follows.

Matches
All times were local, NZDT (UTC+13).

References

External links
OFC Champions League 2020, oceaniafootball.com

1
January 2020 sports events in Oceania
International association football competitions hosted by New Zealand